The Adventures of Huckleberry Finn  is a 1960 American drama film directed by Michael Curtiz. Based on the 1884 novel of the same name by Mark Twain, it was the third sound film version of the story and the second filmed by Metro-Goldwyn-Mayer. The film was the first adaptation of Huckleberry Finn to be filmed in CinemaScope and Technicolor. It stars Eddie Hodges as Huck and former boxer Archie Moore as the runaway slave Jim. Tony Randall also appeared in the film (and received top billing), and Buster Keaton had a bit role in what proved to be his final film for Metro-Goldwyn-Mayer, his former studio. Neville Brand portrayed Pap Finn, Huck's alcoholic father.

Some scenes in the film were shot on the Sacramento River, which doubled for the Mississippi River.

Plot summary

Cast

 Eddie Hodges as Huckleberry Finn
 Archie Moore as Jim
 Tony Randall as The King of France
 Patty McCormack as Joanna Wilkes
 Neville Brand as Pap Finn
 Mickey Shaughnessy as The Duke
 Judy Canova as Sheriff's Wife
 Andy Devine as Mr. Carmody
 Sherry Jackson as Mary Jane Wilkes
 Buster Keaton as Lion Tamer
 Finlay Currie as Capt. Sellers
 Josephine Hutchinson as Widow Douglas
 Parley Baer as Grangeford Man
 John Carradine as Slave Catcher
 Royal Dano as Sheriff of Harlan
 Dean Stanton as Slave Catcher
 Dolores Hawkins as Riverboat Singer

Box office
According to MGM records the film earned $1,950,000 in the U.S. and Canada and $800,000 elsewhere, resulting in a net loss of $99,000.

Comic book adaptation
 Dell Four Color #1114 (July 1960)

See also
List of films featuring slavery

References

External links
 
 
 

1960 films
Films directed by Michael Curtiz
1960 drama films
Films based on Adventures of Huckleberry Finn
Metro-Goldwyn-Mayer films
Films set in the 19th century
Films adapted into comics
Films scored by Jerome Moross
1960s English-language films